Wendell Derek White (born September 3, 1984) is an American former professional basketball player. He has played professionally in the US, South Korea and Japan.

College career
White played two years for Antelope Valley College before receiving a scholarship to the University of Nevada-Las Vegas to play for the Running Rebels from 2005–07, where he averaged 7.73 ppg and 5.3 rpg in 2005-06, and 14.4 ppg and 6.1 rpg in 2006-07. White was an Academic All-Mountain West Conference (MWC) selection in 2006 as a junior and first-team All-MWC selection as a senior in 2007.

Sweet Sixteen
In the second round of the 2006-07 (his senior year) NCAA tournament, White led the UNLV Rebels to a win over the #2 seeded Wisconsin Badgers to get to the sweet sixteen. This was considered a major upset as Wisconsin had been ranked as high as #1 in the country just a few weeks prior to the NCAA tournament. White had 22 points against the Badgers and was player of the game for UNLV.  During the NCAA tournament, he averaged 16.6 pts and 5 rebounds.

Pro career
White signed with the Los Angeles D-Fenders of the NBA Development League on October 1, 2007. He averaged 11.8 points, 5.3 rebounds, and 1.6 assists per game with a .519 field goal percentage.

White played for Wonju Dongbu Promy of the Korean Basketball League for the 2008–09 season.

In 2009-10, as a member of Hamamatsu Phoenix, he was the Japanese Professional Basketball League's MVP, averaging 21.7 ppg and 7.0 rpg.

In 2011-12, he led the Oita Heat Devils with 18.6 ppg and 9.8 rpg.

Personal life
White is of Samoan descent through his mother Rosa Fuamatu. He is married to Kelli White (Valentine), daughter of former Major League baseball players Ellis Valentine, and they have one son.

White is also a cousin of another basketball player of Samoan descent, Peyton Siva, and a cousin of former NFL player Chris Fuamatu-Ma'afala.

References

1984 births
Living people
American expatriate basketball people in Japan
American expatriate basketball people in South Korea
American sportspeople of Samoan descent
Antelope Valley Marauders men's basketball players
Basketball players from California
Ehime Orange Vikings players
Hiroshima Dragonflies players
Kyoto Hannaryz players
Los Angeles D-Fenders players
Samoan men's basketball players
San-en NeoPhoenix players
Sendai 89ers players
Sportspeople from Redondo Beach, California
UNLV Runnin' Rebels basketball players
Wonju DB Promy players
American men's basketball players
Power forwards (basketball)